The 1997–98 George Mason Patriots Men's basketball team represented George Mason University during the 1997–98 NCAA Division I men's basketball season. This was the 32nd season for the program, the first under head coach Jim Larrañaga. The Patriots played their home games at the Patriot Center in Fairfax, Virginia.

Honors and awards 

Colonial Athletic Association All-Conference Team
 George Evans (2nd team)
 Jason Miskiri (2nd team)

Colonial Athletic Association Rookie of the Year
 George Evans

Colonial Athletic Association All-Defensive Team
 George Evans

Player statistics

Schedule and results

|-
!colspan=12 style=| Non-conference regular season

|-
!colspan=12 style=|CAA regular season

|-
!colspan=12 style=|1998 CAA tournament

References

George Mason Patriots men's basketball seasons
George Mason
George Mason men's basketball
George Mason men's basketball